Baron Gustav Evertsson Horn of Marienburg (28 May 1614 – 27 February 1666) was a Finnish-Swedish military man and politician. He was a member of the Privy Council of Sweden and Governor General.

Horn, the son of Field Marshal Evert Horn, was born in 1614 in Southwest Finland, at the time a part Sweden. He became captain in 1635, and a colonel in 1640. In 1651, he was, along with cousin Henrik Horn, raised to a baron. Gustav Horn became a member of the Swedish Privy Council in 1653, and in the following year, he was assigned the role of Governor General of Ingria and Kexholm, an office he left for the assignment of Governor General of Finland in 1657. In 1656 he was appointed general, in 1658 rikstygmästare and in 1663 field marshal. The latter year he also became Governor General of Bremen-Verden. Gustav Evertsson Horn died in Stade, Germany, in 1666.

References

External links

1614 births
1666 deaths
People from Masku
Field marshals of Sweden
Field marshals of Finland
Governors-General of Sweden
Swedish Governors-General of Finland
17th-century Swedish nobility
17th-century Finnish nobility
Members of the Privy Council of Sweden
Finnish Privy Councillors
17th-century Swedish politicians
17th-century Swedish military personnel